The Japan Ice Hockey League (JIHL) (日本アイスホッケーリーグ) was an annual ice hockey league that began in 1966 and ended in 2004 when it was replaced by Asia League Ice Hockey. Only Japanese teams competed in the JIHL.

Baseball and football have been the dominant Japanese sports for decades, but ice hockey in Japan started in the 1920s.

Teams have been competing in the All Japan Championships since 1930, making the tournament one of the oldest sporting competitions in the country.

Professional hockey arrived in 1966 with the Japan Ice Hockey League. Originally a five-team league, the JIHL expanded to six teams in 1974 and stayed that way until tough economic times led to budget cutbacks and eventually the demise of the league in 2004.

Organizers decided the sport could only prosper in Asia if teams in Japan, China and South Korea formed a multinational league, and in 2004 the 38-year-old JIHL was abandoned in favor of Asia League Ice Hockey.

Japan Ice Hockey League champions

Fictional player
Fictional ice hockey player Taro Tsujimoto was said to have come from the "Tokyo Katanas" of the JIHL; neither the player nor the team existed, but were instead the creation of George Imlach. Imlach, as general manager of the Buffalo Sabres, legally drafted Tsujimoto with the 183rd pick in the 1974 NHL Entry Draft, in protest of the league's secrecy policies. When Imlach revealed Tsujimoto was not a real person, the pick was subsequently invalidated.

See also
Asia League Ice Hockey
All Japan Ice hockey Championship

References
 Greenaway, Chris  tokyoessentials.com.
 Japan Ice Hockey League archives
 Japan Ice Hockey archives

External links
Japan Ice Hockey Federation

 
Ice hockey competitions in Japan
Defunct ice hockey leagues in Asia
Defunct sports leagues in Japan